Earleton is an unincorporated community in Alachua County, Florida, United States. In 1888, the community had a hotel, general store, school and church. Vegetables were shipped from the area to the northern states, and wine was produced from locally grown grapes. A post office named "Rosetta" was established in 1886. The name was changed to "Earleton" in 1887. The ZIP code is 32631.

References

Unincorporated communities in Alachua County, Florida
Unincorporated communities in Florida